The Baltimore and Ohio Railroad EL-5 class locomotives were 2-8-8-0 "Consolidation Mallet" steam locomotives built by the Baldwin Locomotive Works in 1919-1920, and were large and heavily modified articulated locomotives built for heavy coal drag on the Baltimore & Ohio. There were 26 Locomotives altogether numbers 7145-7170, these engines went through many modifications, such as larger tenders, conversion from compound to simple articulated, and many more modifications, these engines were in use through World War II and started to be replaced soon after the War by dieselization. The locomotives began retirement in the 1950s with the last unit removed from service in 1955. Sadly, none of these impressive engines were saved from the scrapper´s torch. 

Builder : Baldwin 

Built: 1919-1920 

Numbers: 7145-7170 

Total Produced: 26

Retired: 1955

Scrapped: 1955
Steam locomotives of the United States
2-8-8-0 locomotives
Baltimore and Ohio Railroad
Baltimore and Ohio locomotives
Scrapped locomotives